The Death of Superman is a 2018 American animated superhero film produced by Warner Bros. Animation and DC Entertainment. Based on the comic book storyline of the same name and the second animated adaptation which chronicles the battle between Superman and Doomsday. It is the 32nd installment of the DC Universe Animated Original Movies and the eleventh film of the DC Animated Movie Universe. Released on July 24, 2018 the film received a limited theatrical release on January 13, 2019. A sequel, Reign of the Supermen, was released on January 15, 2019.

Plot
Superman has become a popular superhero in Metropolis and the world. After foiling an attempted abduction of the mayor by Intergang, he takes a piece of their technology to S.T.A.R. Labs for analysis. Following this, Superman is interviewed by Daily Planet reporter Lois Lane about his family heritage and the origins of how he came to Earth. Later that night, Lois meets Clark Kent’s (Superman’s human identity which Lois doesn't know) adoptive parents. Because of her little knowledge about Clark’s personal life, Lois leaves upset and reconsiders their relationship.

At S.T.A.R. Labs, Dr. Silas Stone and Dr. John Irons examine the technology from the Intergang attack and confirm it to be of mixed Apokoliptian and Earth origin, leaving Superman to suspect that his archenemy Lex Luthor was involved in supplying Intergang. Luthor, who is currently in government custody, denies his involvement, but Superman remains suspicious. Meanwhile in space, astronauts Hank Henshaw, his wife Terri, and their crew are suddenly impacted by a meteorite that portaled out of nowhere. The meteor damages their ship, killing Terri and the crew, leaving Hank’s fate unknown. Upon crash landing in the ocean, Lex Luthor sends a submarine crew to investigate while the Atlanteans do the same. Without warning, the Atlanteans and the sub crew are attacked and killed by a large being in a containment suit, who tears across the country on a rampage.

At a restaurant owned by Superman fan Bibbo Bibbowski, Clark confesses to Lois that he is Superman and that he loves her. Meanwhile, the unknown being heads toward Metropolis, attacking everything and everyone it sees until the Justice League arrives to confront it. The being leaves several members of the League injured and nearly kills Wonder Woman before Superman arrives to confront it. The being emerges from its suit and is revealed to be a gray-skinned, white-haired monster with incredible strength, stamina, and invulnerability. The creature, dubbed "Doomsday" by Lois, attacks Superman, who grapples with it. Superman and Doomsday engage in a fierce battle across Metropolis which eventually leaves Superman critically wounded and exhausted. When the monster sees Lois and prepares to kill her, Superman flies toward it at full speed and deals a blow that snaps Doomsday's neck, ending the monster's violent rampage. Superman is victorious, but is stabbed in the chest and dies in Lois' arms, a scene that is filmed by Jimmy Olsen.

In the aftermath, a state funeral is held for Superman and the Kents welcome Lois into their family. Sometime later, Jimmy brings Lois back to Superman's memorial' where his coffin is empty. As the world watches, a figure resembling Superman flies away.

In a series of mid-and post-credits scenes, a clone of Superman survives numerous failed experiments from LexCorp, Dr. Irons is seen forging his own Superman suit from steel, Superman’s rocket buries itself in the North Pole, resulting in the creation of the Fortress of Solitude, and a Superman-like cyborg is seen flying in space.

Voice cast

Mera, Alfred Pennyworth, Damian Wayne, Hawkman, Kate Kane and others appear in non-speaking cameos during Superman's funeral.

Production
The Death of Superman is the 32nd installment in the DC Universe Animated Original Movies line, the 11th film in the DC Animated Movie Universe, and is based on the 1992—1993 DC comic book storyline of the same name. The story had previously been adapted in the 2007 film Superman: Doomsday. However, Superman: Doomsday greatly altered and condensed the story to fit it within a 75-minute runtime, including the events associated with the return of Superman and that sequel-based comic. The Death of Superman was written to be much more faithful to the original story; according to DC's Tim Beedle, the film is "much less condensed and will include many of the fan-favorite moments from the story that were left out of Doomsday". The film is co-directed by Jake Castorena and produced by Warner Bros. Animation and DC Films. According to supervising producer James Tucker, a primary theme of the film is relationships and their impact on Superman's world.

Release
The Death of Superman had its premiere at the San Diego Comic-Con on July 20, 2018 and released in direct-to-video on August 7, distributed by Warner Bros. Home Entertainment on DVD, Blu-ray, and on digital distribution platforms on July 24. The film was also released in a limited theatrical release alongside Reign of the Supermen on January 13, 2019. The film has been re-released on home video, edited together with its sequel, on October 1, 2019 as The Death and Return of Superman.

Reception
On Rotten Tomatoes  of the critics liked the movie with an average rating of  based on  reviews. Kat Calamia of Newsarama called the film "One of DC's Best Animated Films in Past 5 Years", praising its epic scope and the emotional effect it invoked. Evan Narcisse, writing for i09, praised Superman's character arc, his relationship with Lois, and the manner in which DC Universe Movies adapted pre-Crisis storylines into the film's continuity to explore different permutations of those storylines, and effect a sense of threat. Jim Vejvoda, writing for IGN, pointed out that the film was the third time in 11 years that a DC film killed off Superman. Vejvoda found a "tedious" re-use of an old premise, even while conceding that the film presented that plot point in way that was more faithful to the comics storyline than either 2007's Superman: Doomsday or 2016's Batman v Superman: Dawn of Justice.

The Death of Superman peaked at #1 on the Top Ten Blu-ray Sellers for Week and the Top Five Home Media Sellers for Week, scoring a very strong Blu-ray market share of 78%. The film earned $1,081,703 from domestic DVD sales and $6,529,102 from domestic Blu-ray sales, bringing its total domestic home video earnings to $6,527,374.

Accolades
The film was nominated for the Golden Reel Award for Outstanding Achievement in Sound Editing – Sound Effects, Foley, Music, Dialogue and ADR for Non-Theatrical Animated Long Form Broadcast Media award.

Comic book tie-in
In August 2018, DC released a 12-part digital comic series titled The Death of Superman: Part 1, by veteran Superman writer Louise Simonson. In the US, retailer Best Buy offered an exclusive "Deluxe Edition" Blu-Ray containing a hardcover graphic novel titled "The Death of Superman: The Wake". The Best Buy graphic novel includes the last four chapters of Simonson's digital comic series.

 The Death of Superman: The Wake (ISBN 1-77950-113-7/978-1-77950-113-4, 2019-11-20): includes The Death of Superman: Part 1 #1-12.

Sequel

A sequel titled Reign of the Supermen, was released on DVD and Blu-Ray on January 15, 2019. It is based on the second part of the storyline. The cast includes Cameron Monaghan as Kon-El / Conner Kent / Superboy and Charles Halford as Eradicator.

Notes

References

External links

  (Warner Bros.)
  (DC Comics)
 

2018 direct-to-video films
2018 animated films
2010s American animated films
2010s animated superhero films
Animated Superman films
DC Animated Movie Universe
2010s English-language films
Films directed by Sam Liu
Films scored by Frederik Wiedmann
Films set in 2018
Adult animated superhero films
Studio Mir films